Pólya Prize may refer to:

George Pólya Prize, awarded by the Society for Industrial and Applied Mathematics (SIAM)
Pólya Prize (LMS), awarded by the London Mathematical Society

See also
 George Pólya Award, awarded by the Mathematical Association of America